Dorothy Diane "Dedee" Pfeiffer (born January 1, 1964) is an American actress, the younger sister of Michelle Pfeiffer. She began her career appearing in films include Vamp (1986), The Allnighter (1987) and The Horror Show (1989). Pfeiffer later starred as Cybill's daughter, Rachel, in the CBS sitcom Cybill (1995-1998) and as Sheri DeCarlo-Winston in the sitcom For Your Love (1998-2002). In 2020, she began starring as Denise Brisbane in the ABC crime drama series, Big Sky.

Early life
Pfeiffer was born on January 1, 1964, in Midway City, California, the daughter of Donna (née Taverna), a homemaker, and Richard Pfeiffer, a heating and air-conditioning contractor. She is the younger sister of actress Michelle Pfeiffer. She also has an older brother, Rick, and a younger sister, Lori. Her parents were originally from North Dakota.

Career
Pfeiffer began her acting career at the age of 21 with a 1985 appearance on Simon & Simon. The same year, Pfeiffer made her film debut in Into the Night starring her sister, Michelle Pfeiffer. The following years, Pfeiffer had starring roles in a number of films, mostly critically panned, include Vamp (1986), The Allnighter (1987) and The Horror Show (1989). She had secondary roles in films Frankie and Johnny (1991) and Up Close & Personal (1996) starring her sister, and well as Falling Down (1993) and My Family (1995). From 1995 to 1997, she was regular cast member on the CBS sitcom Cybill playing Cybill Shepherd' daughter, Rachel Robbins Blanders. From 1998 to 2002, Pfeiffer starred in the UPN sitcom, For Your Love. Her other television credits include guest-starring roles on Hotel, Murder, She Wrote, Seinfeld, Wings, Ellen, and Friends.
 
Apart from a couple of brief appearances, Pfeiffer took a long break from acting in 2010, almost ten years, battling alcohol addiction. During that time, she earned her master's degree in social work and worked in the field. In 2020, Pfeiffer returned to acting, playing the role of Denise Brisbane in the ABC crime drama series, Big Sky, created by her brother-in-law David E. Kelley.

Filmography

Film

Television

References

External links
 
 
 

1964 births
Living people
People from Midway City, California
Actresses from California
American film actresses
American television actresses
20th-century American actresses
21st-century American actresses